The fourth season of Mad TV, an American sketch comedy series, originally aired in the United States on the Fox Network between September 12, 1998 and May 22, 1999.

Season summary
The new season had several cast changes. Mary Scheer, Chris Hogan, and Lisa Kushell left the show. Andrew Bowen (in what would be his only season) and Mo Collins joined as repertory players, with Michael McDonald as a featured player (and later upgraded to the repertory status). Nicole Sullivan did not appear in the first five episodes of the fourth season. However, she did return in the sixth episode, the show's Halloween special, performing her popular characters Antonia and The Vancome Lady.

Season four had a notable change of pace and format compared to the first three seasons. The show had a faster pace and began to use recurring characters more, as seen with the wacky mother/son duo Doreen (Collins) and Stuart (McDonald) Larkin. Separately, Collins played the eccentric Midwestern character Lorraine Swanson and McDonald played sleazy Jewish director Marvin Tikvah and overexcited dweeb Rusty Miller in sketches that appeared in heavy rotation.

Original cast players Nicole Sullivan and Debra Wilson introduced new characters, playing Latina bimbos Lida and Melina together, while Wilson performed Bunifa, a fast-talking ghetto fabulous girl. Alex Borstein frequently appeared as Ms. Swan and Rosie O'Donnell; Pat Kilbane appeared as the Coffee Guy and the spokesman for Spishak, and performed his Howard Stern impersonation; Will Sasso frequently impersonated famous people such as Bill Clinton, Kenny Rogers, and Steven Seagal; Aries Spears did several impersonations such as Eddie Murphy, Bill Cosby and Magic Johnson, as well as his reoccurring character James Brown Jr.

Season four was marked by one notable controversy. During the February 6, 1999 episode, Bret Hart appeared in a sketch with Will Sasso. Hart, a WCW wrestler, attacked Sasso during filming. It was unclear whether the attack was scripted or an ad-libbed part that was kept in, until a Mad TV head writer revealed that the fight was not scripted, was real, and Sasso was actually injured from it. Hart returned three weeks later to accept Sasso's challenge of an arm-wrestling match.

Opening montage
The Mad TV logo appears against the backdrop of a busy street in Los Angeles. The theme song, which is performed by the hip-hop group Heavy D & the Boyz, begins. Cast members are introduced alphabetically, with their names appearing in caption over a slow-motion montage of color still photos of them. When the last featured cast member is introduced, the music stops and the title sequence ends with the phrase "You are now watching Mad TV."

Cast
Repertory cast members
 Alex Borstein  (25/25 episodes) 
 Andrew Bowen  (25/25 episodes) 
 Mo Collins  (19/25 episodes) 
 Pat Kilbane  (25/25 episodes) 
 Phil LaMarr  (25/25 episodes) 
 Michael McDonald* (20/25 episodes) 
 Will Sasso  (25/25 episodes) 
 Aries Spears  (25/25 episodes) 
 Nicole Sullivan  (21/25 episodes) 
 Debra Wilson  (25/25 episodes) * 'Performer was a featured cast member at the start of the season, but was promoted to repertory status mid-season'.Writers

Bryan Adams (eps. 6-25)
Fax Bahr (eps. 1-25)
Dick Blasucci (eps. 1-25)
Stuart Blumberg (ep. 24) (Season 02 Encore)
Garry Campbell (writing supervisor) (eps. 1-25)
Blaine Capatch (eps. 1-25)
Lauren Dombrowski (eps. 1-25)
Chris Finn (ep. 2) (Season 02 Encore)
Sandy Frank (eps. 1-25)
Spencer Green (eps. 4, 8, 10) (All Encore)
Brian Hartt (eps. 1-25)
Tim Hightower (eps. 2, 24) (both Season 02 Encore)
Torian Hughes (ep. 4) (Season 03 Encore)
Jenna Jolovitz (eps. 1-25)
Brad Kaaya (eps. 2, 24) (both Season 02 Encore)
Scott King (eps. 1-25)
Phil LaMarr (ep. 19)
Lanier Laney (eps. 1-25)
Patton Oswalt (ep. 10) (Season 01 Encore)
Gary Pearson (eps. 1-25)
Devon Shepard (eps. 1-25)
Michael Short (creative consultant) (eps. 1-25)
Adam Small (eps. 1-25)
Terry Sweeney (eps. 1-25)
David Wain (eps. 1-25)
Mary Elizabeth Williams (eps. 4, 8) (Both Encore)

Episodes

<onlyinclude>{{Episode table
|background=#FF7F2D
|overall= 
|season= 
|title=
|titleT=Guest(s)
|airdate=
|episodes=

                  {{Episode list/sublist|Mad TV (season 4)
| EpisodeNumber = 76
| EpisodeNumber2 = 10  | OriginalAirDate =   | RTitle = Shaquille O'Neal | ShortSummary =  Shaquille O'Neal interrupts a monologue by Mother Love (Aries Spears). The Eracists spread their message of tolerance in the Middle East. Lethal Weapon cops Riggs (Pat Kilbane) and Murtaugh (Aries Spears) appear at a comedy club with Kenny Rogers (Will Sasso) and his puppet friend Pappy. On an episode of Forgive or Forget, Mother Love (Aries Spears) hopes to reunite Bobby Brown (Phil LaMarr) with Whitney Houston (Debra Wilson). In a parody of Meet Joe Black, Brad Pitt (Andrew Bowen) tries to escape the clutches of Touched By An Angel's Della Reese (Debra Wilson). Shaquille O'Neal's plea to get out of prison is misunderstood. O'Neil plays Dennis Rodman's sister on Lowered Expectations. Rick (Phil LaMarr) appears as a contestant on The Dating Game; one of his potential suitors is Ms. Swan (Alex Borstein). A college jock (Andrew Bowen) hosts his own show from his dorm room. 
Absent: Mo Collins, Michael McDonald 
| LineColor = FF7F2D  }}                              
}}</onlyinclude>

Home releases
Season four of Mad TV was released on DVD on November 12, 2013 by Shout! Factory. As of 2019, this was the last season of the show to be released on DVD, barring the compilation special MADtv: The Best of Seasons 8, 9, and 10''.

On the HBO Max release, episodes 1, 11, and 24 are missing.

References

External links
 Mad TV - Official website
 
 Jump The Shark - Mad TV

04
1998 American television seasons
1999 American television seasons